The 1980 All-Ireland Senior Camogie Championship Final was the 49th All-Ireland Final and the deciding match of the 1980 All-Ireland Senior Camogie Championship, an inter-county camogie tournament for the top teams in Ireland.

The first game was very close, a dubious Pat Moloney point giving Cork a three-point lead with two minutes left, but straight from the puckout Ann O'Sullivan scored an equalising goal. In the replay, Cork led 1-6 to 0-1 with fifteen minutes left, and a late Limerick rally with goals from Geraldine O'Brien and Helen Mulcaire couldn't stop a Cork win.

References

All-Ireland Senior Camogie Championship Final
All-Ireland Senior Camogie Championship Final
All-Ireland Senior Camogie Championship Final, 1980
All-Ireland Senior Camogie Championship Finals
Cork county camogie team matches